Nenad Lalatović (born 22 December 1977) is a Serbian professional football manager and former player. He is currently coaching the team Mladost GAT.

Club career
Lalatović came through the youth system of hometown club Red Star Belgrade. He also spent a few seasons on loan at OFK Beograd, Radnički Kragujevac and Milicionar, before returning to Red Star Belgrade and becoming one of the team's most regular players in the early 2000s. Before moving abroad in the 2003 winter transfer window, Lalatović was named captain and made over 100 competitive appearances, winning four major domestic trophies with the Crveno-beli.

In January 2003, Lalatović was transferred to Ukrainian side Shakhtar Donetsk on a three-year deal. He failed to make an impact with the club, being loaned to VfL Wolfsburg in early 2004. After returning to Donetsk, Lalatović made a couple of appearances for the club in the title-winning 2004–05 season. He later received a one-year ban from the Ukrainian FA for assaulting the referee after a game between Shakhtar-2 and Zorya Luhansk in October 2005.

In the 2006 winter transfer window, Lalatović returned to his homeland and joined Zemun. He spent six months at the club, before joining OFK Beograd. Following the 2006–07 season, Lalatović retired from professional football, aged 29.

International career
Lalatović earned one cap for FR Yugoslavia at full level, coming on as a substitute for Vuk Rašović in a 1–1 friendly draw away to Greece on 13 December 2000. He was previously a member of the national under-21 team.

Managerial career
After serving as an assistant to Miloš Veselinović, Lalatović took charge of Srem in April 2011. He subsequently served as manager of Proleter Novi Sad for the next two years. In June 2013, Lalatović replaced Aleksandar Janjić at the helm of Voždovac. He eventually switched to Napredak Kruševac in January 2014.

On 23 June 2014, it was announced that Lalatović will be the new manager of Red Star Belgrade. He signed a one-year deal with an option for two more seasons. On 24 May 2015, after the final game of the 2014–15 season, Lalatović became unattached.

On 29 June 2015, Lalatović was officially presented as manager of Borac Čačak. He led the club to a best-ever start to a league season by placing second after the initial 17 rounds. On 10 November 2015, Lalatović parted ways with Borac Čačak due to unpaid wages and bonuses to his players.

On 11 November 2015, Lalatović was appointed manager of Vojvodina until the end of the 2015–16 season. He extended his contract with the club for one more year on 11 June 2016. However, Lalatović terminated his contract with the club by mutual consent on 17 December 2016.

On 26 December 2016, Lalatović became manager of Čukarički, signing a four-year contract. He resigned from the position in May 2018, after failing to earn a spot in the UEFA Europa League. During his time at Čukarički, Lalatović also served as manager of the Serbia national under-21 team at the 2017 UEFA U-21 Championship.

On 4 June 2018, Lalatović was named as new manager of Radnički Niš.

On 21 June 2019, Lalatović was appointed as new manager of Vojvodina for the second time in his managerial career. On 24 June 2020, beating Partizan on penalties, Vojvodina won the 2019–20 Serbian Cup, which was Lalatović's first trophy as manager. Following Vojvodina, he worked at Saudi Arabian club Al Batin and Radnički 1923 back in Serbia.

On 5 June 2022, Bosnian Premier League club Borac Banja Luka appointed Lalatović as manager. He was victorious in his first UEFA Europa Conference League qualifying round game as Borac manager, winning 2–0 against Faroese club B36 Tórshavn on 7 July 2022. Following a series of poor results, which culminated with a 1–0 defeat to Leotar, Lalatović resigned as manager on 26 August 2022.

Managerial statistics

Honours

Player
Red Star Belgrade
First League of Serbia and Montenegro: 1999–2000, 2000–01
Serbia and Montenegro Cup: 1999–2000, 2001–02
Shakhtar Donetsk
Ukrainian Premier League: 2004–05

Manager
Vojvodina
Serbian Cup: 2019–20

References

External links

1977 births
Living people
Footballers from Belgrade
Association football defenders
Expatriate footballers in Germany
Expatriate footballers in Ukraine
FC Shakhtar Donetsk players
FC Shakhtar-2 Donetsk players
First League of Serbia and Montenegro players
FK Borac Čačak managers
FK Čukarički managers
FK Milicionar players
FK Napredak Kruševac managers
FK Radnički 1923 players
FK Radnički Niš managers
FK Vojvodina managers
FK Voždovac managers
FK Zemun players
OFK Beograd players
Red Star Belgrade footballers
Red Star Belgrade managers
Al Batin FC managers
FK Radnički 1923 managers
FK Borac Banja Luka managers
Serbia and Montenegro expatriate footballers
Serbia and Montenegro expatriate sportspeople in Germany
Serbia and Montenegro expatriate sportspeople in Ukraine
Serbia and Montenegro footballers
Serbia and Montenegro international footballers
Serbia and Montenegro under-21 international footballers
Serbia national under-20 football team managers
Serbia national under-21 football team managers
Serbian football managers
Serbian footballers
Serbian SuperLiga managers
Serbian SuperLiga players
Ukrainian Premier League players
Ukrainian First League players
VfL Wolfsburg players
VfL Wolfsburg II players
Saudi Professional League managers
Premier League of Bosnia and Herzegovina managers
Expatriate football managers in Saudi Arabia
Serbian expatriate sportspeople in Saudi Arabia
Expatriate football managers in Bosnia and Herzegovina
Serbian expatriate sportspeople in Bosnia and Herzegovina